Surface Review and Letters is an international journal published by World Scientific. It was launched in 1994, and covers both theoretical and experimental research in physical and properties and processes that occur at the boundaries of materials. Topics covered include surface and interface structures; electronic, magnetic and optical properties; chemical reactions at surfaces; defects, nucleation and growth; and new surface and interface characterization techniques.

Abstracting and indexing 
The journal is abstracted and indexed in:

 Science Citation Index
 ISI Alerting Services
 Materials Science Citation Index
 Current Contents/Physical, Chemical & Earth Sciences
 Astrophysics Data System (ADS) Abstract Service
 Inspec
 Compendex

References

External links 
 

World Scientific academic journals
Engineering journals
Publications established in 1994
English-language journals